Cuchumuela or Khuchumuela is a location in the Cochabamba Department in central Bolivia. It is the seat of the Cuchumuela Municipality, the fifth municipal section of the Punata Province.

References 

 Instituto Nacional de Estadistica de Bolivia

Populated places in Cochabamba Department